Nyssocnemis is a genus of moths of the family Noctuidae.

Species
 Nyssocnemis eversmanni (Lederer, 1853)

References
Natural History Museum Lepidoptera genus database
Nyssocnemis at funet

Noctuinae